The 2002 Philadelphia Wings season marked the team's sixteenth season of operation.

Regular season

Conference standings

Game log
Reference:

Playoffs

Game log
Reference:

Roster
Reference:

See also
 Philadelphia Wings
 2002 NLL season

References

Philadelphia Wings seasons
Philadelphia Wings Season, 2002
Philadelphia Wings